An urban kibbutz (Kibbutz Ironi) is a form of kibbutz located within an existing city. There are currently just over 100 in Israel, totalling around 2,000 members.

Although there were attempts to form urban kibbutzim in the early 20th century, their success was limited and most failed. The idea was revived in the 1970s when they were established as co-operative communities by former kibbutz members and Nahal graduates. They were created as a way of retaining the kibbutz lifestyle whilst moving into mainstream society, but more recently have been seen as a way of combatting social problems; in Haifa the city council asked members of the HaNoar HaOved VeHaLomed youth group to form an urban kibbutz in the Hadar neighbourhood in order to work with at-risk children.

Some standard kibbutzim such as Mesilot began as urban kibbutzim. The urban kibbutz in Gedera was the first Ethiopian kibbutz in the country.

List of urban kibbutzim
Beit Yisrael in Gilo, Jerusalem
Migvan in Sderot
Reshit in Ir Ganim, Jerusalem
Horesh in Kiryat Yovel, Jerusalem
Shomrei HaShalom, a Black Hebrew kibbutz in Dimona
Tamuz in Beit Shemesh
Mish'ol in Nof HaGalil

References

External links
 Beit Yisrael Official Website

 
Urban culture
Types of populated places